Fatu Huku, also known as Fatu Uku, is a small island in the Marquesas Islands, approximately  north of Hiva Oa.

Government and geography

Fatu Huku is located at 9.43°S latitude and 138.93°W longitude. It is administratively part of the commune (municipality) of Hiva Oa in the administrative subdivision of the Marquesas Islands.

Fatu Huku is the youngest of the volcanic Marquesas Islands, estimated to be only 1.3 million years old which accounts, in part, for its ruggedness as erosion has not yet carved out valleys and beaches. Coral is rare in the Marquesas, but a fossilized ancient coral reef is found at the higher elevations of Fatu Huku, the reef being raised above the sea by the volcanic activity that formed the island. The island is also surrounded by a roughly triangular-shaped barrier reef that is completely submerged, but can faintly be seen on satellite images. 

The altitude is insufficient to capture much of the moisture from the predominantly easterly winds. The dryer conditions and steep terrain limit the variety of vegetation. Forty-eight percent of the land, mostly on top of the plateau, is covered with Pisonia forest; 21 percent is grassland, and 31 percent is sparsely vegetated rock. A few coconut trees are found in coastal locations. Unlike inhabited islands, Fatu Huku has few non-native species of plants and is inhabited by sea birds and imported goats and rats.

People and culture

Fatu Huku was likely only ever inhabited in legend.  Unreliability of water sources and lack of land suitable for agriculture were factors preventing any habitation.  Fishermen occasionally visited the island. The story of the demigod Tana-Oa, patron of fishermen, says that the island was once fertile and green, until the sea, jealous of its beauty, turned the island upside down.  It is said that this is how the island came to have coral on its flat top. On the plateau are a number of small heaps of stones, used to leave offerings by hunters visiting the island.

See also

 Desert island
 List of islands

References

Islands of the Marquesas Islands
Uninhabited islands of French Polynesia